Londonpur (Londonpur Grant) is a village in the Tehsil of Gola Gokaran Nath in the district of Lakhimpur Kheri in the Indian state of Uttar Pradesh. It is part of the Lucknow Division.  

Village is located 46 km west of district headquarters Lakhimpur Kheri, 8 km from Kumbhi and 165 km from the Lucknow. The nearest public transportation is Bareilly Railway Station, 114 km from Landanpur Grant. From Gola Gokaran Nath via Mohammadi Road via Ganeshpur travel to Prasadpur and Jhaupur to the Landanpur Grant.

Londonpur Grant township 
Londonpur Grant Township is a township developed in Londonpur with Pradhan Mantri Awas Yojana. Londonpur is located in Uttar Pradesh has many amenities such as tap water in every house, water supply from a water tank to the houses, electricity connection in every house. The village model got appreciation from Chief Minister of Uttar Pradesh.

References

Villages in Lakhimpur Kheri district